Joseph Afolayan is a Nigerian Professor of Civil Engineering (Structural Risk Analysis). He is the former Acting Vice chancellor of Landmark University and the current Vice chancellor of Anchor University Lagos.

Education
Joseph Afolayan started his career at the Ahmadu Bello University (ABU), Zaria where he bagged his First Degree B. Eng in Civil Engineering in 1981. He had his M. Eng and PhD in Structural Engineering from ABU in 1984 and 1994 respectively and became a professor in 2004. Apart from ABU, Afolayan has also attended a couple of other foreign institutions learning skills as an educator, researcher and an administrator.

Professional and administrative career
He joined the Civil Engineering Department of the Federal University of Technology Akure (FUTA) in 2005 and, Landmark University in 2014 from where he joined Anchor University as the Vice Chancellor. At FUTA, he was a HOD and, the Dean, School of Engineering and Engineering Technology.
More recently, Afolayan was the Acting Vice Chancellor of Winners Chapel's own University, Landmark University, Omu-Aran, Kwara State, Nigeria.
The Present and pioneer Vice Chancellor of AUL became a professor in 2004 at the Ahmadu Bello University, Zaria and has continued to keep a busy and discipline life even though he has been charged with a range of academic and administrative tasks both nationally and internationally. It is on record that Afolayan had undertaken more high-profile publications and researches after he became a professor than when he was not.

As an educator and university administrator, Afolayan specialises in Risk Analysis and Strategies for Management of Engineering Systems; Numerical Modelling with Computer Applications in Structural Engineering; and the use of Innovative Materials in Building Industry. He has also supervised research works at different levels of the University for over 30 years.

Honours and recognitions
Afolayan has undertaken academic exchanges as a Scholar across universities in Germany. He is a member of the Council for the Regulation of Engineering in Nigeria (COREN), Nigerian Society of Engineers (NSE), New York Academy of Sciences, the American Society of Civil Engineers (ASCE) and the Structural Stability Research Council (SSRC), the United States among many other international professional organisations.

References

External links
Profile of Prof. Afolayan Anchor University VC

Academic staff of Ahmadu Bello University
Academic staff of the Federal University of Technology Akure
Yoruba academics
Ahmadu Bello University alumni
Living people
Year of birth missing (living people)
Academic staff of Anchor University
Academic staff of Landmark University